Dr. Ramaswami Balasubramaniam (Dr R Balu) is a development scholar, author, public policy advocate, leadership trainer known for his pioneering development work with rural and tribal people in Saragur and Heggadadevana kote Taluks of Mysuru in Karnataka, India. He founded Swami Vivekananda Youth Movement (SVYM), a development organization based in Saragur when he was 19. He is also the Founder and Chairman of the Grassroots Research And Advocacy Movement (GRAAM), a public policy think tank based out of Mysuru. After spending 26 years in development work among rural and tribal people, he pursued academic degrees in leadership, organisational development and public policy. He was the Frank T Rhodes professor at Cornell University between 2012 and 2014, and continues to hold academic positions in Cornell and other universities. His books 'Voices from the Grassroots' and 'I, the citizen' are compilation of narratives and reflections of a development expert and are now globally acclaimed. His book I, the citizen was released in 2015 by the Prime Minister's office.

Early life
Balu studied medicine in Mysore Medical College (SYVM). He was involved in volunteer and rural healthcare work during his medical college days. He founded the Swami Vivekananda Youth Movement in 1984 while he was studying medicine. The organisation was inspired by the works of Swami Vivekananda and the values of Ahimsa, Satya, Seva and Tyaga.

Health and development
As part of SVYM, he set up and operated projects pertaining to preventive, promotive and curative health care, water and sanitation, behavioural change communication, reproductive and child health and HIV-AIDS for marginalized rural and indigenous tribal communities. Working with local tribal communities, he conceived and operated an Integrated Development model for their economic growth. Under his leadership, SVYM started schools and developed community based education programs that reached out more than 50,000 rural children in different parts of Karnataka State. He fought for the rights of the tribal people in the Heggadadevana kote area by petitioning the National Human Rights Commission and ensured successful resolution of their demands. In 2008, he coordinated a community-led movement for good governance using the Right to Information Act. As part of this movement, he walked 350 km through 120 villages and trained and interacted with more than 200,000 people exhorting them to use the RTI act as a tool for development. In 2013, he conceived and led a campaign to deepen democracy and create awareness of electoral issues titled ‘Making Democracy Work’ in Mysore district.

Public policy
He was appointed as the special Investigator for the Karnataka Lok Ayukta and was responsible for investigating complaints of mal-administration and corruption in the health and medical education sectors. In this position, he investigated issues related to corruption in the Public Distribution System between September 2006 to August 2011. He has also served on many committees and panels set up by Karnataka and Indian governments on issues related to tribal development, health, environment, child development and governance.

He served as a member of the Technical Group of Social Stock Exchange (SSE) constituted by the SEBI.

In 2021, he was appointed to the Capacity Building Commission (CBC) of the Government of India as Member - Human Resources.
CBC is a part of the "Mission Karmayogi" - National Programme for Civil Services Capacity Building (NPCSCB).

Other work
Balu conducts leadership workshops for private sector companies, NGOs, government officials and students. He co-founded Vivekanda Institute for Leadership Development (VLEAD) in 2002, and Vivekananda Institute of Indian Studies (VIIS) in 2008, in Mysore. VLEAD  offers training programmes in management, community development and leadership. VLEAD is also involved in various development research activities. VIIS facilitates the study, research, development and dissemination of Indian culture, spirituality, dance, music, art and philosophy, by offering customized courses to Indian and international students. In 2011, Balu founded a public policy research institute called Grassroots Research & Advocacy Movement (GRAAM). It is located in Mysore.

In 2012, Dr. Balu was inducted to serve as the Frank H. T. Rhodes Professor at Cornell University, NY, USA, in recognition to his work in development, public policy and bridging gap between academic research and practice. His blog on development and poverty elimination continues to be one of the prime source for students at Cornell University to understand the process of social and economic development from a grassroots perspective. His lectures and views of global citizenship are well recognized at Cornell.

In 2015, Balu released a book based on a compilation of narratives and reflections of a development activist. The book was crowd-funded and was released by an Indian Minister of State in the Prime Minister's Office. Similar book launches were also held at Cornell University.

Awards and recognition
Balu was given the state youth award by the Government of Karnataka in 1988. He was honoured with the Paul Harris Fellow by Rotary International in recognition of his contributions towards social service in 2000. In 2003, the Kanchi Kamakoti Peetham awarded him the Jayendra Saraswathi Award for his lifetime contribution to social work. In 2011, the Dainik Bhaskar group awarded him the India Pride awards for social development work. In January 2014, he received the Vivekananda Award for Human Excellence from the Ramakrishna Mission. In May 2014, the Society for Indian Medical Anthropology awarded him the Swasthya Seva Ratna Award for outstanding medical service to indigenous tribal communities.

In 2021, Dr. R Balu was recognised as a faculty member who contributed most significantly to the Cornell experience of the Merrill Presidential Scholars. His association with the Cornell University School of Industrial and Labor Relations and the genesis of ILR's Global Service Learning Summer Program   was covered as one of the stories of the 75th-anniversary celebrations of the school.

In 2015, SVYM was also awarded the India NGO of the Year Award by EdelGive Foundation.

Publications 
 Fighting Corruption: The Way Forward (Academic Foundation, 2013)
 Swami Vivekananda: The Benefactor of the Masses (Ramkrishna Mission Institute of Culture, 2013)
 "Swami Vivekananda: The Prophet of Service" in Swami Vivekananda: The Charm of His Personality and Message. R Balasubramaniam (Balu), Swami Atmashradhananda (Sri Ramakrishna Math, 2014)
 The Disease Called Corruption (Vismaya Publications, 2011)
 Swami Vivekananda: As I See Him (Graam, 2014)
 Hosa Kanasu (New Dreams) (Graam, 2014)
 I, the Citizen (Graam, 2015)
 Voices from the Grassroots (Graam, 2018)
 Leadership Lessons for Daily Living (Graam, 2020)

See also
Swami Vivekananda Youth Movement
Swami Vivekananda

References

External links
"Measuring development" on the Hauser Centre Blog of Harvard University
Balu on "The Journey of Leadership" at a TEDx event
An interview on Cornell University Channel being global citizens
Swami Vivekananda Youth Movement's Website
Grassroots Research And Advocacy Movement's Website

1965 births
Living people
Harvard Kennedy School alumni
Indian expatriates in the United States